Joshua Michael Collmenter (born February 7, 1986) is an American professional baseball pitcher who played in Major League Baseball (MLB) for the Arizona Diamondbacks and Atlanta Braves between 2011 and 2017, and currently plays in the Australian Baseball League for the Auckland Tuatara. He attended Central Michigan University and was the 2007 Mid-American Conference Pitcher of the Year.

Early life
Collmenter grew up in rural Homer, Michigan. He learned to pitch by watching baseball on television and reading about how to grip different pitches in Sports Illustrated. His pitching mechanics, however, are the product of a childhood spent with his brothers entertaining themselves by throwing tomahawks at things such as snakes and trees. The process resulted in the development of an unorthodox, extremely overhand pitching motion.

Collmenter attended Homer High School, where he played baseball, basketball and football and graduated as the salutatorian of his class in 2004. Collmenter was one of the top pitchers in Michigan high school baseball history. In 2004, Collmenter led the Trojans to a 38–0 record and the first undefeated championship season in the state's history. That season propelled the Trojans to a national-record 75 game win streak. Collmenter won 18 games in the 2004 season, the third highest total in state history. He recorded a state-record 13 shutouts that season while striking out 223 batters and notching a 0.13 ERA. Collmenter finished his high school career with 49 wins, 23 shutouts, 546 strikeouts and a 0.99 ERA, all of which rank in the top six in state history. Homer compiled a record of 110–18 while Collmenter was with the team.

College
Prior to playing professionally, Collmenter attended Central Michigan University, with whom he played from 2005 to 2007. In his first season with the Chippewas, Collmenter went 7–1 with a 2.70 ERA in 16 games (10 starts). The following season, Collmenter went 8–5 with a 3.41 ERA in 15 games (14 starts). In 2006, he played collegiate summer baseball with the Hyannis Mets of the Cape Cod Baseball League. He went 9–4 with a 1.93 ERA in 15 starts in 2007. He was named the 2007 Mid-American Conference Baseball Pitcher of the Year.

Minor leagues
In 2007, Collmenter was drafted in the 15th round of the amateur draft by the Arizona Diamondbacks. He started his professional career that year, playing for the Yakima Bears in 2007, going 6–3 with a 2.71 ERA in 14 games (12 starts). In 2008, he pitched for the South Bend Silver Hawks, going 12–8 with a 3.41 ERA in 27 starts. He was a well-known figure that season for growing a mustache in the hope of turning the Silver Hawks fortunes around.

The following season, Collmenter went 8–10 with a 4.15 ERA in 27 starts for the Visalia Rawhide. As well, he struck out 152 batters in 145 innings that season. He split the 2010 season between the Rawhide, Mobile Bay Bears and Reno Aces, going a combined 14–8 with a 3.38 ERA in 25 starts.

Major leagues

Arizona Diamondbacks
Collmenter made his major league debut on April 17, 2011, against the San Francisco Giants. Collmenter entered the game in the 11th inning of a 5–5 game. He pitched two perfect innings with two strikeouts. The Diamondbacks would go on to win the game in the bottom of the 12th when Stephen Drew drove in Justin Upton for the game's winning run, cementing Collmenter's first big league win.

Collmenter has caught the eye of some observers due to his unusual over-the-top delivery. It is thought that the deceptiveness of the delivery has attributed to much of his success thus far. He is the first pitcher since earned runs were recorded in 1912 to have given up four or fewer total earned runs and 20 or fewer total hits in his first six starts. Although he does not possess superior velocity to his fastball (average 87 MPH), he relies on throwing a sizable amount of cutters and changeups to keep hitters off-balance. He also throws a curveball less frequently.

In 2011, Collmenter got his first chance to pitch in the playoffs when he faced the Milwaukee Brewers in Game 3 of the Division Series. The D-Backs won the game 8–1 and Collmenter got the win. However, the Brewers would go on to win the best-of-five series, 3–2. Collmenter began the 2012 season in the rotation, but after going 0–2 with a 9.82 ERA in 4 starts and an average of less than 5 innings per start, Collmenter was demoted to the long relief role on April 30, and Patrick Corbin was called up to take his place in the rotation. On November 3, 2015, the Diamondbacks exercised Collmenter's 2016 option.

On July 30, 2016, the Diamondbacks designated Collmenter for assignment, and released him on August 7. On August 10, the Cubs signed Collmenter to a minor league deal.

Atlanta Braves
He was traded to the Atlanta Braves on September 14. Collmenter made his Braves debut three days later, starting a game for the first time since June 7, 2015, and earning a win against the Washington Nationals. He was the sixteenth pitcher to have made a start for the Braves during the 2016 season, breaking a franchise record for the number of starting pitchers used in a single season. The team re-signed Collmenter to a one-year deal worth $1.2 million in November 2016. He pitched well to start the 2017 season, but began struggling in May and was designated for assignment on May 25. He was outrighted to the Triple-A Gwinnett Braves on May 29, 2017. After pitching in five games for Gwinnett at the end of the season, he elected free agency on September 30, 2017.

Auckland Tuatara
In 2018, Collmenter has been added to the New Zealand national baseball team U15 development squad as pitching coach. On August 27, 2018, Collmenter was the first player signed by the Auckland Tuatara, a new expansion team of the Australian Baseball League based in Auckland, New Zealand, for the 2018–19 season. He returned to the club for the 2019–20 season.

Post-playing career
Collmenter was named as the New Zealand pitching coach for the 2021 World Baseball Classic Qualifier. He was also announced as a broadcaster for a series of Spring Training webcasts of Diamondbacks games in 2023.

References

External links

1986 births
Living people
Arizona Diamondbacks players
Arizona League Diamondbacks players
Atlanta Braves players
Auckland Tuatara players
Expatriate baseball players in New Zealand
Baseball coaches from Michigan
Baseball players from Michigan
Central Michigan Chippewas baseball players
Hyannis Harbor Hawks players
Major League Baseball pitchers
Mobile BayBears players
Reno Aces players
South Bend Silver Hawks players
Visalia Rawhide players
Yakima Bears players
American expatriate sportspeople in New Zealand